Sam Ryder (born 25 June 1989) is a British singer and songwriter who rose to prominence through TikTok, after posting music covers during the first UK lockdown of the COVID-19 pandemic in March 2020. His music has incorporated various genres such as rock music, pop, alternative rock, and metalcore, with praise given to his vocals and falsetto. 

He is credited for helping to turn around the UK’s Eurovision fortunes and for how the British public and press view the contest. His entry peaked at number two on the UK Singles Chart, becoming the highest-charting UK Eurovision entry since Gina G's "Ooh Aah... Just a Little Bit" in 1996 and was certified gold by the BPI. Ryder'a debut studio album There's Nothing but Space, Man! (2022), debuted at number one on the UK Albums Chart. He was nominated for Best New Artist at the 2023 Brit Awards, becoming the first Eurovision act to be nominated in this category.

Early life
Sam Ryder was born on 25 June 1989, the youngest child of Keith Robinson, a carpenter, and his wife, Geraldine (née Costelloe), a dental assistant from Hackney, London. He has two elder sisters, Katie and Natalie, born in Newham, east London three years and one year before him respectively. His one sister resides in Sydney, Australia. Ryder was raised in Chelmsford, Essex and attended St John Payne Catholic School in Chelmsford. His first job was delivering papers for The Essex Chronicle as a child.

Ryder was inspired to pursue a career in music after seeing the Canadian rock band Sum 41 in concert at aged 11. Ryder is a big fan of Eurovision and cites Finnish rock band Lordi, as being the inspiration for him learning how to play guitar after the rock band won the Eurovision Song Contest in 2006.

Career

2006–2019: Beginnings
Ryder made his debut as a singer and guitarist at age 16 when he co-founded the band The Morning After, with whom he released two studio albums. Following The Morning After split he joined as a guitarist and new lead vocalist for the Canadian Rock band Blessed by a Broken Heart and contributed to their album Feel the Power. He parted ways with the band in 2013, and became the new lead vocalist for the American Rock band Close Your Eyes, and contributed to their album Line in the Sand and left in 2014.

After his departure from Close Your Eyes, he returned to Britain and spent time working in construction with his father, including helping to build the Wembley Stadium. In 2016, Ryder recorded an album with producer Bryan Wilson in Nashville, Tennessee, although it was never released. He later opened up a vegan café with his partner in Coggeshall, England, before its closure in 2019. He was a wedding singer in the south-east of England until the COVID-19 pandemic.

2020–present: TikTok, Eurovision and There's Nothing but Space, Man! 
Ryder rose to prominence through TikTok where, starting with the first lockdown during the COVID-19 pandemic in March 2020, he began posting his music covers. He caught the attention of musicians such as Elton John, Sia, Justin Bieber and Alicia Keys. By the end of the same year, he was named the most- followed UK artist on the platform. He later signed a record contract with Parlophone. In 2021, he released his debut EP, The Sun's Gonna Rise, which has accumulated over a 100 million global streams. It was followed up with a sold-out tour.

Ryder wrote "Space Man" during the pandemic, and in January 2022, the song was sent to TaP Music and the BBC. In the same month, he accepted their offer to represent the country in the contest. Ryder toured Europe between March and May 2022 to promote his entry. In an interview for Sky News, he spoke about the injury he had sustained in Madrid during his tour after crashing into a metal bar.

On 12 May 2022, the BBC aired a documentary on BBC iPlayer and YouTube which detailed Ryder's journey to Eurovision. At the Eurovision final in Turin, Italy, he finished in second place with 466 points, becoming the highest-scoring UK Eurovision entrant. He won the jury vote and scored the UK its best result since 1998 and its first top three since 2002. Ryder also won a Marcel Bezençon Press Award, becoming the first UK act to win a Bezençon Award. After the contest, "Space Man" peaked at number two on the UK Singles Chart, becoming the highest-charting UK Eurovision entry since Gina G's "Ooh Aah... Just a Little Bit" in 1996. 

In June 2022, Ryder performed "Space Man" at the Queen's Platinum Jubilee concert, Platinum Party at the Palace. In July 2022, he performed the British national anthem at the British Grand Prix at Silverstone. On 19 August, he released his follow-up single, "Somebody", which reached number 77 on the UK Singles Chart. The music video for the song, released the same day, was shot in Šimanovci on the set of Serbian reality show Zadruga.

On 2 September 2022, Ryder released "Living Without You", a collaboration with Sigala and David Guetta. On 3 September, he performed Queen's "Somebody to Love"  alongside with Queen members Brian May and Roger Taylor, at a tribute concert for Taylor Hawkins at London's Wembley Stadium. On 26 September 2022, he performed a headline show at Lafayette in London for National Album Day, in partnership with the charity War Child.

Between October and November 2022, Ryder embarked on his first European tour which spanned 19 dates, beginning in Cologne, Germany on 12 October and concluding in London, United Kingdom on 24 November. He is scheduled to embark on his UK and Ireland tour spanning 14 dates, beginning 17 March 2023 in Belfast and concluding on 5 April 2023 in Brighton. On 13 October 2022, Ryder opened the National Television Awards. "All the Way Over" was released on 4 November 2022, as the next single from his forthcoming debut album. 

On 9 December, his debut studio album There's Nothing but Space, Man! was released. The album debuted atop of the UK Albums Chart, making Ryder the first British male solo artist to debut at number one with their first record in over three years, and the first solo artist to debut at number one with their first full-length release since Olivia Rodrigo's Sour (2021). In the same month, Ryder also performed at the Royal Variety Show. On 22 November, Ryder announced a special New Year’s Eve show, which aired on BBC One and iPlayer, titled Sam Ryder Rocks New Year’s Eve, on 31 December 2022 and 1 January 2023. He was joined by guest musicians, including Melanie C, Sigrid and Justin Hawkins.

In January 2023, Ryder was nominated for Best New Artist at the 2023 Brit Awards, becoming the first Eurovision act to be nominated in this category. In the same month he voiced the character of Brian in Messy Goes to OKIDO, a British television series aired on CBeebies. In February 2023, Ryder performed a cover version of "I'm Good (Blue)" alongside Guetta at the Brit Awards 2023. In March 2023, he released a cover version of "You Got the Love" in partnership for Matalan spring brand campaign.

Personal life 
Ryder started making music at age 13 and has spent most of his adult life touring, writing, and performing for other bands and once resided in Hawaii. In 2018, he was involved in a surfing accident, which pushed him to put more effort into his music career. He is a vegan and once owned a vegan café in Coggeshall, England. He likes to surf the coast of Great Britain in his free time, meditate, travel, snowboard, drive around race tracks and skate. 

Ryder is in a long-term relationship with his partner Lois Gaskin-Barber. He cites David Bowie, Elton John, Freddie Mercury, and Queen among his music influences. Ryder believes in aliens, and once wanted to pursue a career as an astronaut and claims to have seen a UFO while in Hawaii as a child.

Discography

Studio albums

Extended plays

Singles

Promotional singles

Other charting songs

Filmography

Awards and achievements

Notes

References

External links

1989 births
Living people
English male singers
British TikTokers
People from Maldon, Essex
Musicians from Essex
Eurovision Song Contest entrants for the United Kingdom
Eurovision Song Contest entrants of 2022
Parlophone artists